Kamituga Airport  is an airport serving the town of Kamituga in South Kivu Province, Democratic Republic of the Congo.

The airport is in a shallow valley, with rising terrain in all quadrants.

See also

 Transport in the Democratic Republic of the Congo
 List of airports in the Democratic Republic of the Congo

References

External links
 OpenStreetMap - Kamituga Airport
 OurAirports - Kamituga Airport
 FallingRain - Kamituga Airport
 HERE Maps - Kamituga
 

Airports in South Kivu